Aleksandar Mitrović (Serbian Cyrillic: Александар Митровић; born September 24, 1982) is a Serbian volleyball player. He started playing volleyball in OK Kruševac, in his hometown. He was a member of the national team representing Serbia and Montenegro at the 2004 Summer Olympics in Athens.

Career 
 1998–2000   OK Kruševac
 2000–2004   OK Partizan
 2004–2005    Pallavolo Mantoue
 2005–2006    Latina Volley
 2006–2007   Halkbank Ankara
 2007–2009   ASSECO Resovia Rzeszów
 2009   Yaroslavich
 2009–2010   OK Partizan
 2010–2011   GFCO Ajaccio
 2011–2012   UPCN San Huan Voley
 2012–2013   Al Ain ABUDHABI
 2013—   Nice Volley–Ball

External links
 
 Aleksandar Mitrović at Scoresway.com

Living people
1982 births
Sportspeople from Kruševac
Serbian men's volleyball players
Serbia and Montenegro men's volleyball players
Olympic volleyball players of Serbia and Montenegro
Volleyball players at the 2004 Summer Olympics
Serbian expatriate sportspeople in Italy
Serbian expatriate sportspeople in Turkey
Serbian expatriate sportspeople in Poland
Serbian expatriate sportspeople in Russia
Serbian expatriate sportspeople in France
Serbian expatriate sportspeople  in Argentina
Serbian expatriate sportspeople in the United Arab Emirates
Resovia (volleyball) players